Carlos Parra Aranzo (born 18 February 1996) is a Spanish footballer who plays for Zamora CF as a right back.

Club career
Born in Madrid, Parra represented Real Madrid's youth setup for seven years before joining CF Rayo Majadahonda in 2014. Initially assigned to the Juvenil squad, he made his first team debut on 25 January 2015, starting in a 6–2 Tercera División home routing of Alcobendas CF.

For the 2015–16 campaign, Parra joined CD Toledo's reserves, after a short stint at Atlético Madrid. On 23 July 2016, he moved to Fútbol Alcobendas Sport also in the fourth division.

On 12 July 2017, Parra agreed to a contract with AD Alcorcón, being initially assigned to B-team also in the fourth tier. He made his professional debut on 16 February 2019, coming on as a first-half substitute for injured Nono in a 0–1 loss at Real Oviedo in the Segunda División championship.

On 12 July 2019, Parra signed for Zamora CF also in the fourth division.

References

External links
Real Madrid profile
AD Alcorcón profile 

1996 births
Living people
Footballers from Madrid
Spanish footballers
Association football defenders
Segunda División players
Segunda División B players
Tercera División players
CF Rayo Majadahonda players
AD Alcorcón B players
AD Alcorcón footballers
Zamora CF footballers